Dora and Friends: Into the City! (or simply Dora and Friends) is an American educational children's Flash animated television series. The sequel to the original Dora the Explorer series, this series premiered on Nickelodeon on August 18, 2014, and ended on February 5, 2017, in the United States, followed by its Canadian premiere on September 6, 2014, on Treehouse TV.

Plot
Dora, who is now a 10-year-old girl, attends school and lives in the city of Playa Verde. She has five friends: Kate (who loves art), Emma (who loves music), Alana (who loves sports and animals), Naiya (who is smart and enjoys reading), and Pablo (who enjoys playing soccer). Together, Dora and her friends work together and go on adventures while discovering the secrets of their city. Dora has a magical charm bracelet that helps her get through objects in the way and a smartphone, complete with an app version of the previous series' map, to aid her.

The characters are all bilingual and speak Spanish in addition to English. However, the Spanish curriculum on Dora and Friends has been expanded to using simple phrases and commands as opposed to solely the single Spanish words used on Dora the Explorer.

Season two features the return of characters from the original series such as Boots, Benny the Bull, Isa the Iguana, Tico the Squirrel, Swiper the Fox, and Big Red Chicken who appear as guest stars in certain episodes such as the reunion special "Return to the Rainforest", which involves Dora's return to the rainforest in Mexico to rescue Map and Backpack after they are swiped from Boots by Swiper, only to be carried off by a strong wind. At the end of that episode, Backpack is repaired and redesigned by Kate after Backpack is torn apart by a cliff on Tallest Mountain. The special also introduces a young flower named Bud who lives in Isa's garden and had heard all about Dora's adventures from her. Bud ends up getting sewed up as part Backpack by Kate, though he is perfectly fine with it as he gets to go on adventures with Dora and her friends. Bud helps Backpack find and retrieve objects stored inside her for Dora.

In addition to Backpack and Bud, Map returns later in the season following the events of "Return to the Rainforest", effectively replacing Dora's map app. In "For the Birds", older versions of Diego, Alicia, Baby Jaguar (who now goes by just "Jaguar"), and the Bobo Brothers from Go, Diego, Go! appear as well. The series had a few guest stars such as Megan Hilty and Christina Milian.

Characters

 Dora Márquez – An explorer girl who lives in the rainforest, she is now ten years old and now moves here in the big city in Playa Verde.
 Naiya – Friend of Dora's. She knows all about the history of Playa Verde. And also knows about pyramids and booby traps and says there's always a way out.
 Alana – Friend of Dora's. She's good at soccer and also loves animals.
 Emma – Friend of Dora's. She's amazing making music and sing songs.
 Kate – Friend of Dora's. She's an aspring artist and performer who loves to draw pictures, tell stories, and perform in stage shows.
 Pablo – Friend of Dora's. He's good at sports and also a soccer player along with Dora and Alana. He's the only boy in Dora's gang.
 Map App – A digital version of Map on Dora's smartphone. He tells Dora and her friends which way they had to go and watch out for booby traps.
 Mr. Marquez – Dora, Guillermo, and Isabela's father.
 Mrs. Marquez – Dora, Guillermo, and Isabela's mother. Abuela's daughter.
 Guillermo Marquez – Dora's little brother and Isabela's twin brother.
 Isabela Marquez – Dora's little sister and Guillermo's twin sister.
 Abuela – Dora, Guillermo, and Isabela's grandma. Mrs. Marquez's mother.
 Lucky – Abuela's cat.
 Perrito – Dora's dog.
 Boots – He's a monkey and Dora's best friend in the rainforest.
 Map – Dora's map. He was rescued by Dora from the big wind when he was swiped by Swiper along with Backpack.
 Backpack – Dora's backpack. She was swiped by Swiper along with Map, and saved by Dora just in time when she falls off the tallest mountain from the big wind. She was torn apart and has been fixed by Kate with bright brand new colors.
 Bud – A little flower who lives in Isa's garden. He heard stories about Dora the Explorer and asked to come along on adventure to save Backpack and Map. At the end, Bud ends up being sewed on Backpack, he gets to go on adventures with Dora and her friends. He helps Backpack to get supplies out when Dora and her friends needs.
 Isa – Dora's friend at the rainforest. She's an iguana. She loves working garden and plant things.
 Benny – Dora's friend at the rainforest. He's a bull.
 Tico – Dora's friend at the rainforest. He's a squirrel, he speaks Spanish and English.
 Swiper – He's a fox from the rainforest who swipes everyone's things.
 Big Red Chicken – He's a red chicken from the rainforest.
 The Grumpy Old Troll – A troll who lives under the bridge with his wife Petunia in the rainforest and guides the bridge.

Voices
 Fátima Ptacek as Dora, Malencua, Monsters, Los Duendes, Perrito, Dragons, Dragon, Kids, Girl, Crowd, Villagers, Sprite, and Penguins
 Eduardo Aristizabal as Pablo (Season 1), Kids, Ghosts, Cusco, Party Guests, Monkeys, Kids, Jack, and Dwarf
 Mateo Lizcano as Singing Pablo (Season 1 only), Fairy, Sidekick Cat, Doggie Land Dog, Bat, Firefighter Monster, Squeeze, Andres, Musicland Citizens, Fishy, Kids, Crowd, Troll Princes, Audience, Crowd, Purple Team, Announcer, Villagers, Sprite, Penguins, and Pablo's Speaking and Singing voices (Season 2)
 Alexandria Suarez as Naiya, Digger, Sidekick Cat, Doggie Land Dog, Musicland Citizens, Kids, Dragons, Alley Cat, Fireflies, Dancer, and Audience
 Ashley Earnest as Alana, Rico, Police Dog, Buddy Team, Little Girl, Party Guests, Kids, Alley Cat, Dancer, Audience, and Party Guest
 Kayta Thomas as Emma, Fairies, Lala, Musicland Citizens, Kids, Crowd, Dancer, Audience, Bird-Emma, and Party Guest
 Isabela Moner as Kate, Kids, Townsfork, Monsters, Fairy, Roja, Doggie Land Dog, Musicland Citizens, Dress Rack, Girl, Queen Bee, Katrin, Princesa, Marribel, Purple Team, and Guitarist Elf
 Marc Weiner as Map App, Drawbridge, Firefighter Dog, Doggie Land Dog, Sidekick Bandit, Swiper, Map, Fiesta Trio, and Mean Turtle
 Breanna Lakatos as Isabela (Season 1), Ghosts, Brassy, Violeta, Kids, Backpack, Marisol, Baker Elf, Little Girl Villager, Girl in Classroom, Crowd, Kids, Gnaomi, Hummingbirds, Uno, and Little Kids
 Mia Sanchez as Isabela (Season 2), Guard, and Clowns
 Miguel Cardona as Guillermo, Miguel, Bunny, Puppies, Alley Cat, Piggy, Squeeze, Andrés, Fishy, Little Boy Villager, Boy in Classroom, Bobby, Caterpillar, Buffterfly, Guard, Little Boy, Crowd, Monkey, Musicland Citizens, and Kids
 Julian Rebolledo as Mayor, Referee, Cowboy Monster, Takeaway Truck, Musicland Citizens, Bandit Boss, Bandit, Papi, Magicians, Playing Card, Llama, Señor Antonio, Villagers, Baker, and Guard
 Eileen Galindo as Mami (Season 1), Pirate, and Buddy Team
 Leila Colom as Mami (Season 2), Mama Música, Musicland Citizens, Fortune Teller, Magician, Momma Dragon, Young Momma Dragon, Clowns, Queen, Boy's Mama, Crowd, Soccer Coach, Referee, Crowd, and Dulce's Mami
 Miriam Cruz as Abuela and Vendors
 Leslie Valdes as Dragon, Los Duendes, Sr. Chugga Chugga, Kite Judge, El Giante, Bus Driver, Snow Monster, and Dulce's Father
 Chris Gifford as Pirates, Gate, Alarm, Grumpy Old Troll, Big Red Chicken, and Golden Parrot
 Sebastian Arcelus as Pirate Ship, Pirate Captain, Matador, Soldier, Sir Jim, Box, Guards, and Villagers
 David Crommett as Pablo's Abuelo, Older Man, Chocolate Tree, Papi ("Return to the Rainforest"), and Audience
 Olivia Coronel as Kitty, Doggie Land Dog, Plink, Mia, Tabitha, Kids, Armadillo, and Lulu
 Jorge Vega as Jorge, Little Boys, Students, Kids, Gingerbread Man, Tico, Squeeky, and Party Guest
 Koda Gursoy as Pinguino, Kids, Piggy, Boots, Gnorman, Jaguar, Rainforest Animals, Sprite, and Mo the Sock Monkey
 Aidan Gemme as Benny, Fireflies, Troll, and Little Kids
 Celine Cardona as Isa, Kids, Sara (Smelly), Party Guest, Carolina, and Clowns
 John Rocco as Bud, Tres, Quackers, Shivers, and Baby Unicorn
 Nicolas Cantu as Diego, Polar Bear, Crocodile, and Clowns
 Franchesca Valdes as Alicia
 Lewis Grosso as Cusco, Maximo, and Woodworker Elf
 Anthony Pierini as Puppies
 Ashton Woerz as Puppies, Boy, Mouse, Bowl of Beans, and Audience
 Sofia Lopez as Littlest Piggy
 Peter Lurye as Frogs, Mice, and Horses
 Jenna Iacono as Bowl of Rice and Girl
 Jamie Cantone as Celia, Puppy Princess, Troll, and Dulce
 Sean Kenin as Wizard, Cat, and Townsfolk
 Adam Sietz as Serpiente
 Eric Campus as Baker, Doggie Land Dog, and Mayor
 Naomi Rosado as Mariana the Mermaid and Penguin Chick
 Evelyn Guaman as Piggy
 William Poon as Clownie
 Sebastian Banes as Oatmeal and Kids
 Paolo Poucel as Miguel's Mommy, Farmer Ana Maria, and Bandit
 Joel Someillan as Berries
 Lewis Grosso as Captain Cat
 Robert Jimenez as Mayor Dog
 Allison Strong as Farmer Dog, Doggie Land Dog, and Villagers
 Olive Valdes as Kids and Crowd
 Violet Valdes as Kids
 Sebastian De Casteja as Marko and Kids
 Sam Mercedes as Sloth
 Raquel Wallace as Princess and Little Girls
 Kiara Marte as June and Little Girls
 Derek Sosa as Mousey and Students
 Jessica Conde as Princess, Students, and La Maestra Carmen
 Sophie Tanabaum as Cukoo Birds
 Asa Seigel as Tick-Tock Train
 Anthony Pierini as Monkey
 Jesus Martinez as Judge and Lightning
 Prince Royce as Wizard
 Isabel Galupo as Bicycle Taxi Driver
 Alexia Kohn as Susi, Kids, and Ballerina Elf
 Flora Mendoza as La Maestra Julia, Crowd, and Elf
 Mike Smith Rivera as Marty, Ogre, Mateo, Audience, Elf, and Bruno
 Angela Bennett as Betti and Vendors
 Eric Campos as Mayor and Vendors
 Kyndra Sanchez as June
 Shirley Rumierk as Mati
 Armando Riesco as King, Announcer, Wizard, and Guard
 Annie Kozuch as Tournament Official and Announcer
 Kathleen Herles as Camp Counselor
 George Gabriel as Littlest Bird and Birds
 Alyssa Mazei as Penguin
 Lori Felipe-Barkin as Valerie and Flash
 Candida Guevara as Serena and Eagle

Guest stars
 Gabe Saporta as Victor
 Megan Hilty as La Diva
 Olga Merediz as Emma's Grandma and Wagnerian Woman
 Christina Milian as La Sirena Mala
 Diane Guerrero as Pinenut and Fairy
 Raul Esparza as Big Bad Wolf and Coconut King
 Thalía as The Queen

Episodes

Pilot special
A 43-minute pilot titled Dora's Explorer Girls: Our First Concert premiered on August 7, 2011. Dora and her friends get five tickets to see Shakira in concert. When they lose them, they have to find them before the concert starts. The special was written by Chris Gifford and directed by Henry Lenardin-Madden.

Cast
 Stephanie Joy as Dora (speaking voice)
 Karina Padura as Dora (singing voice)
 Jessica Conde as Alana (speaking voice)
 Natali Padura as Alana (singing voice)
 Giselle Monterroso as Emma (speaking voice)
 Jasmine Maslanova-Brown as Emma (singing voice)
 Elly Morillo as Kate (speaking voice)
 Raquel Trinidad as Kate (singing voice)
 Ashley Mendola as Naiya (speaking voice)
 Maria Paula Gonzalez as Naiya (singing voice)
 Pablo Napoli Borrero as Jorge, Second Place Boy, and Crowd
 Miriam Cruz as Abuela and Crowd
 Eileen Galindo as Mami, Truck Driver, and Crowd
 Carlos Ibarra as Donation Clerk, Ticket Taker, and Crowd
 Julian Rebolledo as Señor, Street Fair Barker, and Crowd
 Regan Mizrahi as Boots
 Shakira as Herself

Production
A pilot episode titled Dora's Explorer Girls: Our First Concert aired on August 7, 2011, on Nick Jr. in the United States. One month later, it aired on Treehouse TV in Canada. Following the release of Dora's Explorer Girls: Our First Concert, Nickelodeon announced in 2013 that it would produce a spin-off to Dora the Explorer titled Dora and Friends: Into the City! starring Dora as a 10-year-old who goes on city adventures with a group of new friends. The series has been picked up for 20 episodes and had its prime-time premiere on Nickelodeon on August 18, 2014. The show is animated using Toon Boom Harmony. On October 9, 2014, Nickelodeon renewed the series for a 20-episode second season.
Reruns also currently air on the Nick Jr. Channel. The show was canceled on February 5, 2017, after two seasons.

Broadcast
Dora and Friends: Into the City! premiered on Treehouse TV in Canada on September 6, 2014, and on Nick Jr. in the United Kingdom, Ireland, Australia, and New Zealand on November 3, 2014. Channel 5's Milkshake! strand also premiered the show. In Southeast Asia, the series debuted on March 16, 2015, on Nickelodeon in Singapore, and in Spain on Clan TVE. In India, the show airs on Nick HD+. in South Korea, and in Korea on Skylife's Children English Channel Kids Talk Talk Plus not in Nickeldeon Korea the show airs fail

Merchandise

DVD releases
Nickelodeon produced a number of DVDs based on the show, with Paramount for Region 1; and with Universal / Sony for Region 4.

References

2014 American television series debuts
2017 American television series endings
2010s American animated television series
2010s Nickelodeon original programming
Into the City
American children's animated adventure television series
American flash animated television series
American preschool education television series
American sequel television series
Animated preschool education television series
2010s preschool education television series
Animated television series about children
English-language television shows
Hispanic and Latino American television
Nick Jr. original programming
Older versions of cartoon characters
Spanish-language education television programming
Television series set in 2003